Parallel 59 is a BBC Books original novel written by Stephen Cole and Natalie Dallaire and based on the long-running British science fiction television series Doctor Who. It features the Eighth Doctor, Fitz and Compassion.

External links

2000 British novels
2000 science fiction novels
Eighth Doctor Adventures
Novels by Stephen Cole